The Port Harcourt Tourist Beach is a white sand urban beach in Port Harcourt, Rivers State, Nigeria, created in 1988. It is located along Kolabi Creek, east of the Old Township district, and about 146 miles from Kribi in Cameroon. There is another nice and beautiful beach in Port Harcourt, which is Kalio Beach, beach parties are held there every 2 January to celebrate a new year.

The beach is designed to cater for the recreational needs of everyone especially young people. It is visited by both tourists and residents, and it is one of the most popular beaches in Port Harcourt.

References

Urban beaches
Tourist attractions in Port Harcourt
1980s establishments in Rivers State
Port Harcourt (local government area)
Beaches of Rivers State
Entertainment venues in Port Harcourt
1988 establishments in Nigeria
Outdoor structures in Nigeria